Lesbian, gay, bisexual, and transgender (LGBT) people in Niger face legal challenges not experienced by non-LGBT residents. Same-sex sexual activity is legal, however LGBT persons face stigmatization among the broader population.

Law regarding same-sex sexual activity
Same-sex sexual activity is legal in Niger, but the age of consent is not equal for same-sex and opposite-sex sexual activity. The age of consent is set at 13 years for heterosexuals and 21 years for homosexuals.

Recognition of same-sex relationships
Niger does not legally recognize same-sex unions.

Discrimination protections
There is no legal protection against discrimination based on sexual orientation or gender identity.

Living conditions

The U.S. Department of State's 2010 Human Rights Report found that "there were no known organizations of lesbian, gay, bisexual, or transgender persons and no reports of 
violence against individuals based on their sexual orientation or gender identity. However, gay persons experienced societal discrimination."

Summary table

See also

 Human rights in Niger
 LGBT rights in Africa

References

Human rights in Niger
Law of Niger
Politics of Niger
Niger
LGBT in Niger